Zarrin may refer to:
 Zarrin, East Azerbaijan
 Zarrin, Kohgiluyeh and Boyer-Ahmad
 Zarrin, Tehran, a mountain range south of Mount Damavand, north of Absard
 Zarrin Rural District (disambiguation)

See also
 Zarin (disambiguation)